Poldl Resch (11 October 1900 – 18 January 1971) was an Austrian footballer. He played in 16 matches for the Austria national football team from 1922 to 1927.

References

External links
 

1900 births
1971 deaths
Austrian footballers
Austria international footballers
Place of birth missing
Association footballers not categorized by position